(29 August 1881 – 11 April 1966) was a Japanese yōga painter.

Biography
Born in Tokyo, the eldest son in a family of picture framers, Yamashita Shintarō's schooling included English and Classical Chinese. He went on to study under Fujishima Takeji and Kuroda Seiki at Tokyo School of Fine Arts, graduating in 1904. After learning French at the Tokyo School of Foreign Languages, in 1905 he travelled via America to France, where he studied with Raphaël Collin and Fernand Cormon and at the École des Beaux-Arts. In 1907 he visited Spain, copying The Surrender of Breda by Velázquez, before returning to Paris via Granada and Seville. In 1908 "By the Window" was exhibited at the Salon; Reading and After Reading appearing the following year. In 1909 he travelled through Switzerland and Italy, visiting Milan, Venice, Florence, and Naples, Menton and Marseille. After returning to Paris, he painted Woman at her Shoes. The following summer he returned via the Suez Canal to Japan.

Shortly after returning he married. Later that year he exhibited for the first time at the Bunten, contributing Reading, After Reading, and Woman at her Shoes, winning third prize with Reading. He repeated the feat the following year with By the Window, which was acquired by the Ministry of Education, Science, and Culture. His first daughter was born in 1912 and first son in 1914. Boys' Festival, featuring his eldest son aged ten months, was exhibited at the "Nikaten" exhibition at the Nihonbashi Mitsukoshi later in 1915.

In 1925 he assumed a leading role in the fine art division of the Bunka Gakuin. Two years later he contributed Poetry Party at the Imperial Palace to the Meiji Memorial Picture Gallery. Later that same year he left Kobe for France. While in Paris, he helped restore the Kanō school Namban byōbu known as "the Portuguese" at the Musée Guimet. After his return to Japan in 1932, he was awarded the Legion of Honour. That same year, he exhibited thirty-five works from his European travels at the Nikaten.

In 1935 he withdrew from the Nikakai and joined the Imperial Fine Arts Academy. In 1937 he became a member of the reorganised Imperial Art Academy. In 1941 there was a special exhibition of his works in honour of his sixtieth birthday and he resigned from the Bunka Gakuin. In 1946 he exhibited at the first . In 1955 he was selected as a Person of Cultural Merit. The following year there was an exhibition of his works at the Bridgestone Museum of Art. In 1961 he became an adviser to the Nitten. In 1964 he was decorated with the Order of the Rising Sun. Yamashita Shintarō died in 1966 at the age of 84.

Select works

See also

 List of Yōga painters
 Nakamura Tsune

References

1881 births
1966 deaths
Yōga painters
Persons of Cultural Merit
Chevaliers of the Légion d'honneur